F. Calvert Strong (August 12, 1907 – January 27, 2000) was an American water polo player who competed in the 1932 Summer Olympics.

Biography
Strong was born in Jacksonville, Illinois and died in Carmichael, California. He was part of the American team which won the bronze medal. He played all four matches. In 1981, he was inducted into the USA Water Polo Hall of Fame.

See also
 List of Olympic medalists in water polo (men)

References

External links
 
 Interview 1988 by George Hodak

1907 births
2000 deaths
American male water polo players
Water polo players at the 1932 Summer Olympics
Olympic bronze medalists for the United States in water polo
Sportspeople from Jacksonville, Illinois
Medalists at the 1932 Summer Olympics
People from Carmichael, California